Polycaste (Ancient Greek: Πολυκάστη) is the name of several different women in Greek mythology:

Polycaste, a princess of Pylos and daughter of King Nestor and Eurydice (or Anaxibia). She was sister to Thrasymedes, Peisistratus, Pisidice, Perseus, Stratichus, Aretus, Echephron and Antilochus. Polycaste bathed Telemachus on his way to Pylos and later married him. They had a son, Persepolis.
Polycaste, daughter of Lygaeus. She was married to Icarius, by whom she became the mother of Penelope, Alyzeus and Leucadius.
Polycaste, sister of Daedalus and the mother of Perdix. Because her brother killed her son, she laughed with joy when she saw Icarus (Daedalus' own son) fall into the sea and drown when he had flown too close to the sun.

Notes

References 

 Apollodorus, The Library with an English Translation by Sir James George Frazer, F.B.A., F.R.S. in 2 Volumes, Cambridge, MA, Harvard University Press; London, William Heinemann Ltd. 1921. ISBN 0-674-99135-4. Online version at the Perseus Digital Library. Greek text available from the same website.
Homer, The Odyssey with an English Translation by A.T. Murray, PH.D. in two volumes. Cambridge, MA., Harvard University Press; London, William Heinemann, Ltd. 1919. . Online version at the Perseus Digital Library. Greek text available from the same website.
 Strabo, The Geography of Strabo. Edition by H.L. Jones. Cambridge, Mass.: Harvard University Press; London: William Heinemann, Ltd. 1924. Online version at the Perseus Digital Library.
 Strabo, Geographica edited by A. Meineke. Leipzig: Teubner. 1877. Greek text available at the Perseus Digital Library.

External links
 Polycaste Family Tree

Princesses in Greek mythology
Pylian characters in Greek mythology
Children of Nestor (mythology)